Plaza de las Américas Juan Pablo II (formerly Plaza Constitución) is an urban square in Zapopan, in the Mexican state of Jalisco.

See also
 Cabeza Vainilla, a sculpture in the square

References

External links

 

Plazas in Jalisco
Zapopan